Dennis P. Gallagher (born December 19, 1963) is a former New York City Council member who represented the 30th district in Queens, including the neighborhoods of Middle Village, Glendale, Ridgewood, Richmond Hill, Woodhaven, and Forest Hills. Gallagher was one of only three Republicans in the 51-member city council, and the only one not representing a Staten Island district.

Biography
Born in Brooklyn, New York, he was the middle child of 7 children. Gallagher attended St. Michael's elementary school, Power Memorial Academy and Pace University.

Gallagher held a variety of positions in the public sector before being elected to office. These positions included Investigator for the State of New York Crime Victims Board, Regional Coordinator for the New York State Assembly, Executive Assistant (secretary) to State Senator Serphin R. Maltese, and Chief of Staff to his predecessor, Councilman Thomas V. Ognibene.

Gallagher was first elected to the council in 2001. He won re-election in 2005.  He resigned his office after being charged with rape and eventually pleaded guilty to forcible sexual touching and sexual abuse in the third degree on March 17, 2008 in Queens County Criminal Court.

References

New York City Council members
New York (state) Republicans
Living people
New York (state) politicians convicted of crimes
Politicians from Brooklyn
People from Queens, New York
1963 births
Pace University alumni